West Pleasant View is an unincorporated community and a census-designated place (CDP) located in and governed by Jefferson County, Colorado, United States. The CDP is a part of the Denver–Aurora–Lakewood, CO Metropolitan Statistical Area. The population of the West Pleasant View CDP was 3,840 at the United States Census 2010. The Pleasant View Metropolitan District provides services. The Golden post office (Zip code 80401) serves the area.

Geography
West Pleasant View is bordered to the west by Golden, to the east by Lakewood, and to the north by unincorporated Applewood. Interstate 70, U.S. Route 6, and U.S. Route 40 (West Colfax Avenue) all cross the community from west to east.

Demographics

Education
Colorado's second largest school district, the Jefferson County Public Schools, has its headquarters in West Pleasant View.

Zoned schools include:
 Elementary schools: Shelton and Welchester
 Middle schools: Bell
 Golden High School

See also

Outline of Colorado
Index of Colorado-related articles
State of Colorado
Colorado cities and towns
Colorado census designated places
Colorado counties
Jefferson County, Colorado
Colorado metropolitan areas
Front Range Urban Corridor
North Central Colorado Urban Area
Denver-Aurora-Boulder, CO Combined Statistical Area
Denver-Aurora-Broomfield, CO Metropolitan Statistical Area

References

External links

Pleasant View Metropolitan District website
Jefferson County website
Jeffco Public Schools

Census-designated places in Jefferson County, Colorado
Census-designated places in Colorado
Denver metropolitan area